Veliki Ban is a settlement in the Žumberak/Gorjanci Hills in the Municipality of Šentjernej in southeastern Slovenia. To the south its territory extends right to the border with Croatia. It is part of the traditional region of Lower Carniola and is now included in the Southeast Slovenia Statistical Region.

References

External links
Veliki Ban on Geopedia

Populated places in the Municipality of Šentjernej